Marcus Jones (born 24 June 1974) is an English former footballer who played as a defender in the Football League. He made only two Football League appearance for Cheltenham Town He had spent the vast majority of his career in non league football with teams like Yeovil Town, Northwich Victoria, Scarborough and Telford United.

Playing career
Born in Stone, Staffordshire, Jones began his career at Stoke City, before embarking on a non league career with teams such as
Chasetown, Bolehall Swifts, Willenhall Town, Hinckley Athletic, VS Rugby, Stafford Rangers, Telford United, Scarborough.

He made a surprise move to Cheltenham Town in November 2000 due to an injury crisis at Whaddon Road. He made his debut in an LDV Trophy match against Southend United and his first Football League appearance vs Scunthorpe United as a sub. His first and only other start for the club was against Torquay United on 6 January 2001. He left soon after and joined Yeovil Town, making his debut on 17 February 2001 against Boston United.

After leaving Yeovil Town he went back north this time to Northwich Victoria where he was team captain.

He later returned to the Scarborough area and turned out for local team Eastfield as well as playing local Sunday football for teams like Strongwood and Star, before being appointed player coach at Scarborough Town in 2008.

Career statistics
Source:

References

External links

1974 births
Living people
People from Stone, Staffordshire
English footballers
Association football defenders
Scarborough F.C. players
Cheltenham Town F.C. players
Yeovil Town F.C. players
Bolehall Swifts F.C. players
English Football League players
National League (English football) players
Northwich Victoria F.C. players